Two ships of the Royal Fleet Auxiliary have borne the name RFA Olwen:

She was renamed RFA Olwen in 1937 and was sold in 1947.
  was an oiler launched in 1964 as RFA Olynthus. She was renamed RFA Olwen in 1967 and was sold in 2001.

Royal Fleet Auxiliary ship names